Aleya Sen is an Indian director, producer and writer of Bollywood films. She made her directorial and writing debut with the film Dil Juunglee (2018). She also produced the film Badhaai Ho in 2018.

Career
Sen started her career as an assistant director under Pradeep Sarkar in Delhi. In 2004, Sen along Amit Sharma and Hemant Bhandari, established Chrome Pictures Pvt Ltd. a production house in Mumbai.

Filmography
Dil Juunglee (2018) (director)
Badhaai Ho (2018) (producer)

Awards
 Bronze Medal at the ‘Cannes Lion and gold at ‘Goa film festival’ for ‘THE SILENT NATIONAL ANTHEM’ in 2011.

References

External links
 

Living people
Indian women film directors
Hindi-language film directors
21st-century Indian women writers
21st-century Indian writers
Indian women screenwriters
21st-century Indian film directors
Hindi screenwriters
Year of birth missing (living people)
21st-century Indian screenwriters